The James Cavanaugh House, at 564 Woodside Ave. in Park City, Utah, was built in 1891.  It was listed on the National Register of Historic Places in 1984.

It is a one-story pyramid with a truncated pyramid roof.  Its design is typical for pyramid houses with a square plan and its "door set slightly offcenter between two groups of windows."

The house, albeit perhaps remodeled and with a modern roof, appears to be still in place in 2019.

References

External links

National Register of Historic Places in Summit County, Utah
Houses completed in 1891